Protodejeania is a genus of flies in the family Tachinidae.

Species
P. dichroma (Wulp, 1888)
P. downsi Curran, 1947
P. echinata (Thomson, 1869)
P. hystricosa (Williston, 1886)
P. major Curran, 1947
P. pachecoi Curran, 1947
P. willistoni Curran, 1947

References

Tachininae
Tachinidae genera
Taxa named by Charles Henry Tyler Townsend